Alina Abdurakhimova (born 23 March 1995) is an Uzbekistani former professional tennis player.

A Tashkent native, Abdurakhimova competed as a wildcard in the main draw of the 2010 Tashkent Open and featured in the qualifying draw of her home tournament a further three times. 

In 2014 she played a doubles rubber for the Uzbekistan Fed Cup team, against South Korea in Astana, Kazakhstan.

Abdurakhimova was a collegiate tennis player for Temple University between 2014 and 2018.

References

External links
 
 
 
 

1995 births
Living people
Uzbekistani female tennis players
Temple Owls tennis players
College women's tennis players in the United States
Sportspeople from Tashkent
21st-century Uzbekistani women